Sir John Te Herekiekie Grace  (28 July 1905 – 11 August 1985) was a New Zealand interpreter, public servant, community leader and New Zealand's first High Commissioner to Fiji. Of Māori descent, he identified with the Ngāti Tūwharetoa . He was born in Wanganui, New Zealand on 28 July 1905.

Grace was appointed a Member of the Royal Victorian Order in the 1954 New Zealand Royal Visit Honours. In the 1968 New Year Honours, he was appointed a Knight Commander of the Order of the British Empire, for services to the Māori people and in public affairs.

References

1905 births
1985 deaths
20th-century translators
Interpreters
New Zealand Māori public servants
New Zealand Knights Commander of the Order of the British Empire
New Zealand Members of the Royal Victorian Order
New Zealand public servants
Ngāti Tūwharetoa people
People from Whanganui
New Zealand expatriates in Fiji